Eucalyptus socialis subsp. eucentrica, commonly known as the inland red mallee, is a subspecies of mallee that is endemic to inland Australia. It usually has rough bark on the base of the trunk, smooth bark above, lance-shaped adult leaves, flower buds in groups of between seven and eleven, pale creamy yellow flowers and barrel-shaped  to urn-shaped or spherical fruit.

Description
It usually has rough, loose, fibrous or flaky bark at the base of the trunk, smooth tan to grey bark above. The branchlets and flower buds have a waxy covering.

Taxonomy and naming
In 1991, Lawrie Johnson and Ken Hill first formally described Eucalyptus eucentrica in the journal Telopea from specimens collected near Erldunda in the Northern Territory. In 2005, Dean Nicolle reduced the species to a subspecies of E. socialis as E. socialis subsp. eucentrica, publishing the change in Australian Systematic Botany. The change has been accepted by the Australian Plant Census. The epithet eucentrica is derived from ancient Greek word elements meaning "well" and "of the centre", referring to the subspecies' wide distribution in central Australia.

Distribution and habitat
Inland red mallee grows in mallee, often in stony places and with other eucalypts, including E. gamophylla and E. oxymitra. It is widespread from the Gascoyne region of Western Australia to the southern Northern Territory and north-western South Australia, with scattered populations in central Queensland.

Conservation status
This mallee subspecies is classified as "not threatened" by the Western Australian Government Department of Parks and Wildlife.

References 

socialis
Myrtales of Australia
Flora of the Northern Territory
Flora of South Australia
Flora of Queensland
Eucalypts of Western Australia
Plants described in 1991
Taxa named by Lawrence Alexander Sidney Johnson
Taxa named by Ken Hill (botanist)